Harel Brigade (Hativat Harel) is a reserve brigade of the Israel Defense Forces, today part of the Southern Command. It played a critical role in the  1948 Palestine war, also known as "Israel's War of Independence." It is one of the former divisions of the Palmach, the elite fighting force of the Haganah, that remains in the Israeli Defense Forces.

History

War of Independence

The Harel Brigade was established on 16 April 1948 as a division of the Palmach, immediately after Operation Nachshon. It was composed of three battalions (Sha'ar Hagai - known as the First Battalion; Ha-portzim - known as the Second Battalion; and the Giv'ati 54th Battalion). 1,400 men, which had fought in Operation Nachshon in the Jerusalem area. Therefore, its name Harel ("Mountain of God") is taken from mount Zion in Jerusalem.  This infantry unit was headed by Yitzhak Rabin, who was appointed its first commander, and who was later replaced by Joseph Tabenkin.
During the early phase of the 1948 Palestine War (Israeli war of independence), the Palmach units became tactical combat units. In April 1948, the Harel brigade (AKA the 10th brigade) was formed to command all units in the Jerusalem corridor and hills. The Brigade's main assignments, besides acting as a "diversionary force" whenever needed, were twofold:
 To fortify the area, guarding against attacks by the local Arab forces, and gaining ground where ever possible, in order to allow passage of supply convoys to Jerusalem.
 To train and organize troops in the framework of the army-in-the-making.

Upon its establishment, the brigade commenced with Operation Harel, a direct continuation of Operation Nachshon, between 16 and 21 April 1948. On April 22, the brigade was assigned to Operation Yevusi with the goal of taking control of the northern ridges overlooking Jerusalem, and then taking control of the city's southern neighborhoods. During this operation the brigade sustained thirty-three killed in the battle for Nebi Samuel and nineteen dead in the Katamon neighborhood.

In Operation Maccabi during the first half of May 1948, the Harel Brigade took control of the Jerusalem corridor and opened the road until Shaar Hagai. On 17–19 May, a Harel force took Mount Zion and entered the Jewish Quarter in the Old City of Jerusalem.

Later the brigade took part in Operation Danny, Operation Ha-Har, and Operation Horev.

The Palmach memorial website records 274 of its members dying while fighting with the Harel Brigade. Thirty-four were killed at Nabi Samuel and eighteen in Katamon.

Suez Crisis
During the Suez Crisis (Kadesh Operation) in 1956, the brigade fought as an infantry brigade commanded by Shmuel Gudar. In 1959, the brigade was made into a reserve unit of the Armored Corps.

Six-Day War
During the Six-Day War, the Harel Brigade used Sherman tanks in fighting at Radar Hill, north of Jerusalem, and went on to capture Ramallah.

Present
In 2014, the Brigade became part of the Sinai Division and it participated in Operation Protective Edge.

See also
 List of battles and operations in the 1948 Palestine war

References

1948 Arab–Israeli War
Brigades of Israel
Palmach
Military units and formations established in 1948